was a feudal domain under the Tokugawa shogunate of Edo period Japan, in Harima Province in what is now the southwestern portion of modern-day Hyōgo Prefecture. It was centered around the Mikusa jin'ya which was located in what is now the city of Katō, Hyōgo. It was controlled by a cadet branch fudai daimyō Niwa clan throughout its history.

History
The Isshiki-Niwa clan ruled the20,000 koku Iwamura Domain in Mino Province for five generations from 1638 to 1702. The Isshiki-Niwa clan was a cadet branch of the Ashikaga clan, and was thus no relation to the more famous Niwa Nagahide, although both clans served Oda Nobunaga, and later Tokugawa Ieyasu. The Niwa clan ruled for five generations. Due to internal conflicts created by a reform policy, Niwa Ujioto was demoted to 10,000 koku and reassigned to Takayanagi Domain in Echigo Province. His son, Niwa Shigeuji, served in the guard of Osaka Castle in 1739, and his holdings in Echigo were exchanged for holdings in Kawachi, Harima and Mimasaka Provinces. In 1746, he relocated his seat to Mikusa, marking the start of Mikusa Domain. The Isshiki-Niwa clan was unusual in that they were exempt from the sankin kōtai requirement of alternative year attendance on the Shogun in Edo. The domain was an early supporter of the imperial cause in the Boshin War.  In 1871, with the abolition of the han system, the domain became "Mikusa Prefecture", which was merged with "Shikama Prefecture", which in turn became part of Hyōgo Prefecture.

The Isshiki-Niwa clan was ennobled with the kazoku peerage title of shishaku (viscount) in 1884.

Holdings at the end of the Edo period
As with most domains in the han system, Mikusa Domain consisted of several discontinuous territories calculated to provide the assigned kokudaka, based on periodic cadastral surveys and projected agricultural yields.

Harima Province 
3 villages in Minō District
8 villages in Katō District
11 villages in Taka District
11 villages in Kasai District

List of daimyō 

{| class=wikitable
! #||Name || Tenure || Courtesy title || Court Rank || kokudaka 
|-
|colspan=6|  Niwa clan, 1746-1871 (Fudai)
|-
||1||||1746 - 1757||Izumi-no-kami (和泉守)||Junior 5th Rank, Lower Grade (従五位下)||10,000 koku
|-
||2||||1757 - 1771||Shikibu-shoyu (式部少輔)|| Junior 5th Rank, Lower Grade (従五位下)||10,000 koku
|-
||3||||1771 - 1796||Shikibu-shoyu (式部少輔)|| Junior 5th Rank, Lower Grade (従五位下)||10,000 koku
|-
||4||||1796 - 1827||Shikibu-shoyu (式部少輔)|| Junior 5th Rank, Lower Grade (従五位下)||10,000 koku
|-
||5||||1827 - 1854||Wakasa-no-kami (若狭守)|| Junior 5th Rank, Lower Grade (従五位下)||10,000 koku
|-
||6||||1854 - 1871||Nagato-no-kami (長門守)|| Junior 5th Rank, Lower Grade (従五位下)||10,000 koku
|-
|}

See also 
 List of Han
 Abolition of the han system

Further reading
 Bolitho, Harold. (1974). Treasures Among Men: The Fudai Daimyo in Tokugawa Japan. New Haven: Yale University Press.  ;  OCLC 185685588

References

Domains of Japan
1871 disestablishments in Japan
States and territories disestablished in 1871
Harima Province
History of Hyōgo Prefecture